Frederik Lassen (born February 20, 1986) is a Danish footballer playing for the Danish 1st Division club Ølstykke FC.

Lassen started his football career in Brødeskov near Hillerød, Denmark. He then moved to play for Farum BK, and at the age of sixteen, became the top scorer in the Junior League in Denmark.

Moving to FC Nordsjælland, he played in their senior tram in the 2004-05 season. Before the start of the 2005-06 season, Lassen transferred to Ølstykke.

External links
Danish national team profile

1986 births
Danish men's footballers
Living people
FC Nordsjælland players
Ølstykke FC players
Association football forwards